The 2021 Calgary Stampeders season was the 63rd season for the team in the Canadian Football League and their 76th overall. The Stampeders qualified for the playoffs for the 16th straight year following their week 15 victory over the BC Lions on November 12, 2021. However, the team lost the West Semi-Final in double overtime to the Saskatchewan Roughriders by a score of 33–30. The 2021 season was Dave Dickenson's fifth season as head coach and John Hufnagel's 13th season as general manager.

An 18-game season schedule was originally released on November 20, 2020, but it was announced on April 21, 2021 that the start of the season would likely be delayed until August and feature a 14-game schedule. On June 15, 2021, the league released the revised 14-game schedule with regular season play beginning on August 5, 2021.

Offseason

CFL Global Draft
The 2021 CFL Global Draft took place on April 15, 2021. With the format being a snake draft, the Stampeders selected seventh in the odd-numbered rounds and third in the even-numbered rounds. The team exchanged their fourth-round pick for a third-round pick as part of a three-player trade with the Toronto Argonauts.

CFL National Draft
The 2021 CFL Draft took place on May 4, 2021. The Stampeders had six selections in the six-round snake draft and had the eighth pick in odd rounds and the second pick in even rounds. The team exchanged their sixth-round pick for a fifth-round pick as part of a three-player trade with the Toronto Argonauts.

Preseason
Due to the shortening of the season, the CFL confirmed that pre-season games would not be played in 2021.

Planned schedule

Regular season

Standings

Schedule
The Stampeders initially had a schedule that featured 18 regular season games beginning on June 12 and ending on October 29. The team was scheduled to play in a neutral site game on July 10 with the Toronto Argonauts serving as the home team. However, due to the COVID-19 pandemic in Canada, the Canadian Football League delayed the start of the regular season to August 5, 2021 and the Stampeders began their 14-game season on August 7, 2021.

Post-season

Schedule

Team

Roster

Coaching staff

References

External links
 

Calgary Stampeders seasons
2021 Canadian Football League season by team
2021 in Alberta